Marguerite Lamkin Brown Harrity Littman (May 4, 1930October 16, 2020) was an American-British socialite and HIV/AIDS activist. As a Southern American accent coach she is known to have coached actors including Elizabeth Taylor and Paul Newman. Littman is remembered for her role in HIV/AIDS advocacy, including fundraising for charities.

Early life 
Marguerite Lamkin was born on May 4, 1930, to Eugenia and Ebenezer Lamkin in Monroe, Louisiana. Her father was a lawyer and her mother a homemaker. She studied philosophy at Newcomb College and later at Finch College in New York City. Her brother, Speed Lamkin, went on to become a novelist and playwright.

Career 
She moved to Los Angeles after her studies in New York and became a voice coach specializing in the Southern American accent. She coached actors including Elizabeth Taylor and Paul Newman in southern-themed movies such as Baby Doll, Cat on a Hot Tin Roof, The Long, Hot Summer, and Raintree County. Author Truman Capote famously modeled his famous southern character, Holly Golightly, in his 1958 Breakfast at Tiffany's novella after Littman.

In the early 1960s, she moved to New York City, where she worked with photographer Richard Avedon, supporting him while he was working on his book Nothing Personal (1964), a collection of portraits of civil rights workers. She was also an advice columnist for Glamour magazine. She moved to London in 1965. Between 1976 and 1985, she modelled for Andy Warhol's minimalist Polaroid portraits, depicting her transformation over the nine-year period.

Littman started the AIDS Crisis Trust in 1986, as a charity to collect funds for AIDS research and treatment. As a start, she had written to over 300 of her socialite friends asking for a contribution of £100 to be founding members. The trust organized gala events and auctions to raise funds for the cause. The trust went on to become one of Britain's most prominent AIDS-awareness charity groups. The trust's auctions would offer pieces from her socialite friends including Elizabeth Taylor and David Hockney. During this period, Littman was introduced to Diana, Princess of Wales, who was already associated with AIDS-related charities across the world. In 1997, Diana donated her entire wardrobe to Littman to be auctioned. The auction, facilitated by Christie's, raised more than $3 million for the trust and other charities.

In 1999, the trust was merged with the Elton John AIDS Foundation, for whom Littman served as a director.

Personal life 
Lamkin married screenwriter Harry Brown on September 20, 1952; the union ended in divorce. On March 10, 1959, she remarried to actor Rory Harrity; this marriage also ended in divorce. She then married British barrister and Queen's Counsel Mark Littman, a union which lasted from 1965 until his death in 2015.

Littman died on October 16, 2020, at her home in London. Her obituary in the New York Times stated:

References 

1930 births
2020 deaths
Activists from Louisiana
American socialites
British socialites
British women activists
Finch College alumni
HIV/AIDS activists
People from Monroe, Louisiana
Tulane University alumni
21st-century American women